Edward Adrian Zackarian (January 2, 1922 – January 9, 2002) was an American country music artist. Zack was primarily known for his appearances on various radio shows.

Life 

Zack was born in 1922 in Rhode Island and first sang at the age of 16 with his brother Richie, who should start a career later under the stage name "Cousin Richie".

In 1939 Zack founded The Dude Ranchers. By 1948 Zack had released his first record, and in 1951 signed a contract with Decca Records. In 1953 he moved to Columbia Records. Some titles were "You Knew Me When You Were Lonely", "Cryin 'Tears" and "I'm Gonna Roll And Rock", many of which were recorded together with brother Richie.

Eddie Zack died in 2002 after an operation, at the age of 79.

References

External links 

1922 births
2002 deaths
American country singer-songwriters
American country rock singers
Country musicians from Rhode Island
Musicians from Providence, Rhode Island
20th-century American singers
Songwriters from Rhode Island
American people of Armenian descent